Sivakasi railway station is a railway station in the City of Sivakasi, Virudhunagar district in Tamil Nadu.

Jurisdiction
It belongs to the Madurai railway division of the Southern Railway zone of Virudhunagar district in Tamil Nadu. The station code is SVKS.

Line

Notable places nearby
 Badrakali Amman temple, Sivakasi
 Ninra Narayana Perumal temple

References

External links

Railway stations in Virudhunagar district
Madurai railway division